Taylor Cassidy Woods (born September 26, 1994) is a Canadian ice hockey player, currently playing with the Toronto Six of the Premier Hockey Federation (PHF). A two-way forward who has occasionally also played as a defenceman, she won the Clarkson Cup with the Markham Thunder in 2018 and scored the last regular season goal in Canadian Women's Hockey League (CWHL) history.

Playing career
Woods began playing in the Saskatchewan Female U18 AAA Hockey League (SFU18AAAHL), the top minor ice hockey league in the province, as a high school freshman with the Notre Dame Hounds of Athol Murray College of Notre Dame. She was the team’s top point scorer in her first season, notching 23 points in 28 games, and was a top-three point scorer on the team in the following two seasons. With the Hounds, Woods won gold at the 2011 Esso Cup, Canada’s national women's midget hockey championship, in addition to setting a tournament record with 12 assists.

During her senior year, 2011–12, she played in the Junior Women's Hockey League (JWHL) with the Balmoral Hall Blazers of Balmoral Hall School and set a team record for assists in a season, with 41 assists in 30 games.

NCAA 
Woods joined the Cornell Big Red women's ice hockey program in 2012, beginning as a third-line centre and playoff specialist during her rookie NCAA season. She scored in her first game with the university, finishing her rookie year with 22 points, good for third on the team in goals, including a hat-trick in the ECAC Hockey Tournament Semifinal. For her third year with the university, she switched positions to play as a defenceman, before moving back to forward for her senior season. She finished her time at Cornell with 81 points in 131 games and remains the sixth leading all-time short handed scorer for the team.

Professional 
She was drafted 23rd overall by the Brampton Thunder in the 2016 CWHL Draft. 

In May 2019, she joined the newly formed Professional Women's Hockey Players Association (PWHPA) after the collapse of the CWHL. During the 2019–20 PWHPA Dream Gap Tour, she played for Team Johnston at the Unifor Women's Hockey Showcase in September 2019 and for Team Spooner at the Secret Women's Hockey Showcase in January 2020.

She opted to part ways with the PWHPA in April 2020 and instead signed with the Toronto Six, the first Canadian NWHL team, as one of the original five players to join the team. Her first NWHL goal took place in a January 24, 2021 contest versus the 2019 Clarkson Cup champion Minnesota Whitecaps.

International 

Woods competed as member of Team Canada at the 2012 IIHF World Women's U18 Championship. She joined a roster filled with other future hockey stars, including Cayley Mercer, Laura Stacey, Erin Ambrose, Emerance Maschmeyer, and future Toronto Six teammate Elaine Chuli. Woods scored Canada’s opening goal of the tournament, in their match against Switzerland, and was named best player of the game by the team. She finished the tournament with three goals and three assists and her performance helped Team Canada sweep the tournament and win gold that year.

Career statistics

Regular season and playoffs

International

Awards and honors

References

External links 
 
 

1994 births
Living people
Canadian women's ice hockey forwards
Ice hockey people from Manitoba
People from Morden, Manitoba
Toronto Six players
Brampton Thunder players
Markham Thunder players
Cornell Big Red women's ice hockey players
Balmoral Hall School alumni

Athol Murray College of Notre Dame alumni